The Maritime Gendarmerie is a component of the French National Gendarmerie under operational control of the chief of staff of the French Navy. It employs 1,157 personnel and operates around thirty patrol boats and high-speed motorboats distributed on the littoral waterways of France. Like their land-based colleagues the Gendarmes Maritime are military personnel carry out policing operations in addition to their primary role as a coast guard service. They also carry out provost duties within the French Navy.

The uniforms and insignia of the Gendarmerie Maritime are very similar to those of the French Navy, but the ranks used are those of the rest of the Gendarmerie (which are the same as the traditional ranks of the French Cavalry).

Mission
The mission of the Maritime Gendarmerie is as follows:
 Maritime safety and of general police force duties in the territorial waters and EEZ, under the authority of the maritime prefect.
 Criminal Investigation Department under the authority of public prosecutor.
 Protection of the naval shore establishments.
 Search and rescue.

Organisation
The Maritime Gendarmerie is commanded by a colonel who is assisted by a staff located in Paris. The coastguard is articulated in 3 groupings, 7 companies and 64 units (brigades of research, brigades of monitoring of the littoral, group of safety of the protected zones, group of monitoring of intervention and reinforcement, patrol craft, coastal high-speed motorboats of maritime surveillance) whose geographical distribution is as follows:

 Metropolitan France :
 grouping of the English Channel and the North Sea in Cherbourg (2 companies)
 grouping of the Atlantic in Brest (4 companies);
 grouping of the Mediterranean in Toulon (2 companies);
company from Paris to the Career-on-Seine (under the authority of the state major);
 national instruction center of the GM (C.N.I.G.M) in Toulon.
 Overseas:
 Guadeloupe: 1 patrol craft; (Violette)
 French Guiana: 2 high-speed 20-metre motorboats (Charente and Organabo);
 Mayotte: 1 patrol craft (20-metre high-speed motorboat - Odet);
 French Polynesia: 1 patrol craft (Jasmin) and a brigade;
 New Caledonia: 1 high-speed motorboat of 20 meters (Dumbéa) and 2 brigades;
 Réunion: 1 high-speed 20-metre patrol boat (Verdon), forward deployed in Mayotte as of early 2023

Patrol boats

See also
Water Police
United States Coast Guard

References

External links
Official Site of the Gendarmerie Maritime on Ministry of Defense French only
Official Site of the Gendarmerie Maritime on Ministry of Interior French only
Forum anciens Gendarmes Maritimes French only

Coast guards
French Gendarmerie
Gendarmerie
Maritime safety in France
Port law enforcement agencies
Maritime law enforcement agencies